Iodine chloride may refer to:

 Iodine monochloride, ICl
 Iodine dichloride, ICl2−
 Iodine trichloride, ICl3